Ullam is a 2012 Indian Tamil-language film directed by Arunmoorthy and produced by Vedha, starring Mithun and Priyamani , while Raghuvaran and Karunas amongst others in supporting roles.

The film has a music score composed by Yuvan Shankar Raja, while Suresh Urs handled the editing of the venture. The film after production delays failed to gain a theatrical release and was released straight to DVD in 2012. The film was premiered in Sun TV on 1 June 2013.

Cast
 Mithun Tejaswi as Raja
 Priyamani as Kavitha
 Deepu
 Raghuvaran as Kavitha's father
 Karunas
 Vaiyapuri
 Ambika
 Anu Hasan
 Ponnambalam
 Pandu

Production
Filming began in 2003, while Priyamani was still yet to have her first film release in Kangalal Kaidhu Sei. Made by Arulmurthy, an apprentice of director Shankar, the team shot two songs in Nepal in mid 2003. By 2006, the film was described by critics as "unreleased".

Soundtrack

Release
Efforts were made to release the film again in 2007. The film was eventually released straight to DVD in 2012 and thus did not have a proper theatrical release.

References

2012 films
2010s Tamil-language films
Films scored by Yuvan Shankar Raja
2012 directorial debut films
Indian romance films
Indian direct-to-video films
2012 romance films
2012 direct-to-video films